Rural is an unincorporated community in Clermont County, in the U.S. state of Ohio.

History
Rural was laid out in 1845. A post office was established at Rural in 1845, and remained in operation until 1911.

References

Unincorporated communities in Clermont County, Ohio
Unincorporated communities in Ohio